Grga or Grgo are Croatian variants of "Gregory", found in Croatia, Bosnia and Herzegovina and Serbia.

It may refer to:

 Budislav Grga Angjelinović (1886–1946), Croatian politician and lawyer 
 Grgo Gamulin (1910–1997), Croatian art historian, literary critic and writer
 Grgo Ilijić (1736–1813), Bosnian Franciscan friar and bishop
 Grgo Kusić (1892–1918), Croatian soldier
 Grgo Martić (1822-1905), Bosnian Croat friar and writer
 Grga Novak (1888-1978), Croatian historian
 Grgo Petrović (1883–1945) birth name of Leo Petrović, Bosnian Franciscan and historian
  (1932-2008), Croatian poet and essayist

See also
Grgur, given name
Grgić, surname

Croatian masculine given names